Mesopsocus unipunctatus is a species of barklouse found across the Holarctic. It is a member of the Mesopsocidae family. It is a generalist that occurs on branches of deciduous and coniferous trees, as well as lower hedgerows and shaded meadows.

Description
This species is a generally greyish or otherwise pale species with one or two prominent transverse bands across the abdomen. The rest of the body is erratically mottled with dark markings. It is flightless and the antennae are almost twice the body length. The body length ranges from 2.5-3.7mm.

Range
This species occurs frequently in Great Britain and Ireland. It can also be found in Bulgaria, Hungary, Latvia, Poland, Romania, and Western Europe (except Greece).

Some populations also exist in North America, where it occurs throughout Canada and the United States.

Habitat
The species feed on trees of various kinds including alder, ash, beech, birch, blackthorn, cedar, elder, elm, gorse, hawthorn, hazel, juniper, maple, larch, oak, pine, sea buckthorn, sycamore, and yew. It also likes to feed on apples, bramble, pears, plums, and snowberries.

References

Mesopsocidae
Insects described in 1764
Psocoptera of Europe
Taxa named by Otto Friedrich Müller